State Route 267 (SR 267), also known as Statesville Road, is a short secondary state highway in Wilson County, Tennessee, that connects SR 96 with U.S. Route 70 (US 70).

Route description

SR 267 begins in the community of Prosperity at an intersection with SR 96. It winds its way northwest through farmland to pass through the community of Statesville. SR 267 then turns northward winds its way through some hills before entering the town of Watertown and coming to an end at an intersection with US 70/SR 26. The entire route of SR 267 is a two-lane highway.

Major intersections

References

267
Transportation in Wilson County, Tennessee